Changes is the third studio album by Swedish singer Pandora. It was released in December 1996 by MCA Records. The album peaked at number 29 in Sweden.

Track listing 
 "Prologue: Echoes" (Henrik Andersson) – 0:45
 "It's Alright" (Martin Ankelius, Peter Johansson) – 3:59
 "A Little Bit" (Andersson, Ankelius, Pandora) – 3:29
 "The Sands of Time" (Ankelius, Johansson) – 3:47
 "Anything" (Ankelius, Johansson) – 3:56
 "Why" (Andersson, Ankelius, Pandora) – 4:43
 "Any Time Of Season"  (featuring G. Cole)  (Ankelius, Johansson) – 3:19
 "Smile 'n' Shine" (Ankelius, Johansson) – 3:43
 "If You Want It (Come and Get It)" (Andersson, Johansson) – 3:49
 "Goin' On" (Andersson, Johansson) – 3:26
 "Love and Glory" (Kee Marcello, Mats Nyman, Pandora) – 4:02
 "Waves of Memories (Epilogue)" (Andersson, Johansson) – 4:45
 "A Little Bit" (Double M's Radio Edit-Short)  – 3:32  (international bonus track)

Charts

Certifications

Release history

References 

1996 albums
Pandora (singer) albums
MCA Records albums
Universal Records albums